Bruno da Silva Fonseca (born 14 September 1992), known as Bruno Silva, is a Brazilian football player who plays for Portuguese club Vilafranquense.

Club career
He made his professional debut in the Segunda Liga for Gil Vicente on 31 October 2015 in a game against Olhanense.

On 5 January 2023, Silva signed with Vilafranquense.

References

External links
 
 

1992 births
Sportspeople from Salvador, Bahia
Living people
Brazilian footballers
Association football fullbacks
Esporte Clube Jacuipense players
Gil Vicente F.C. players
Moreirense F.C. players
F.C. Felgueiras 1932 players
C.D. Mafra players
U.D. Vilafranquense players
Campeonato Brasileiro Série D players
Primeira Liga players
Liga Portugal 2 players
Brazilian expatriate footballers
Brazilian expatriate sportspeople in Portugal
Expatriate footballers in Portugal